The Caspar C 24 was a German two-seat biplane sports aircraft that flew in 1925.

Design and development
The C.24 was a biplane of all-wood construction. One C.24 was built, which received the civil registration D-675. It took part in the 1925 Deutschen Rundflug.

Specifications

References

Citations

Bibliography

C024
Biplanes
Single-engined tractor aircraft
Aircraft first flown in 1925